Karl Meyer (4 September 1899 – 18 May 1990) was a German biochemist. He worked on connective tissue and determined the properties of hyaluronan in the 1930s.

Biography
He was born on 4 September 1899 in Kerpen, Germany. Meyer studied medicine and received his Ph.D. from the University of Cologne in 1924. He moved to Berlin and received a Ph.D. in chemistry from the Kaiser Wilhelm Society in 1927. 
In 1930 Herbert Evans invited Meyer to work as assistant professor at the University of California, Berkeley.
He then moved to New York and worked at the Columbia University doing research on hyaluronan.

A resident of Teaneck, New Jersey, Meyer died at the age of 90 on May 18, 1990, at a nursing home in nearby Cresskill.

Awards
 1956 Albert Lasker Award for Basic Medical Research
 1965 Member of the American Academy of Arts and Sciences
 1967 Member of the National Academy of Sciences

Legacy
The Society for Complex Carbohydrates (now Society for Glycobiology) presents the Karl Meyer Award since 1991.

References

1899 births
1990 deaths
German biochemists
Columbia University faculty
University of Cologne alumni
Recipients of the Albert Lasker Award for Basic Medical Research
Members of the United States National Academy of Sciences
People from Teaneck, New Jersey